The Kennedy Dream (subtitled A Musical Tribute to John Fitzgerald Kennedy) is an album by American composer/arranger Oliver Nelson recorded in memory of the late U.S. President John F. Kennedy. It was released in 1967 on the Impulse! label.

Reception
The Allmusic review by Michael G. Nastos awarded the album 3½ stars, stating "In February of 1967, Oliver Nelson recognized Kennedy's contributions and assembled a big band to play music in his honor, with taped segments of his speeches as preludes. The result is a heartfelt yet eerie combination, perhaps a bit off-putting, but absolutely relevant decades later. The music is reflective of the changing times as identified by Nelson, ranging from commercial movie score-type music, to soulful or straight-ahead jazz, bop, and the modern big-band sound that the leader, composer, and orchestrator owned... it's a stark reminder of how one man can positively influence the human condition aside from politics and corporate greed, and how another can change his world musically".

Track listing
All compositions by Oliver Nelson except as indicated

 "Let the Word Go Forth" - 6:16
 "A Genuine Peace" - 2:37
 "The Rights of All" - 3:57
 "Tolerance" - 3:23
 "The Artists' Rightful Place" - 3:29
 "Jacqueline" - 2:15
 "Day in Dallas" - 3:40
 "John Kennedy Memory Waltz" (George David Weiss) - 3:22

Recorded on February 16 (#3, 4, 7) and February 17, 1967 (#1, 2, 5, 6, 8).

Personnel
Oliver Nelson - tenor saxophone, soprano saxophone, arranger, conductor
Phil Woods - alto saxophone
Snooky Young - trumpet
Jerry Dodgion, Jerome Richardson - reeds
Don Butterfield - tuba
Phil Bodner - English horn
Danny Bank - bass clarinet
Hank Jones - piano, clavinet
George Duvivier - bass
Grady Tate - drums
John F. Kennedy - voice
Unidentified strings

See also
 Cultural depictions of John F. Kennedy

References

Impulse! Records albums
Oliver Nelson albums
1967 albums
Albums produced by Bob Thiele
Concept albums
Albums conducted by Oliver Nelson
Albums arranged by Oliver Nelson
Works about John F. Kennedy
Cultural depictions of John F. Kennedy